Mathias Kullström (born 2 February 1987) is a Finnish footballer. He was born in Oravais.

References 

1987 births
Living people
Finnish footballers
Veikkausliiga players
FF Jaro players
Association football defenders
FC Kiisto players
Jakobstads BK players